The Anticorruption Bureau (OA) of Argentina is a division of the Argentine federal government tasked with auditing the country's public sector and introducing public policies oriented towards preventing political corruption. It is formally a decentralized agency reporting to the Ministry of Justice and Human Rights.

The bureau was created in 1999, as part of the inaugural measures of president Fernando de la Rúa. The Bureau is led by the Secretary of Public Ethics, Transparency, and the Fight against Corruption. Since 2019, Félix Crous has held the position.

See also 
Corruption in Argentina
Interior Security System

References

External links 
 

Federal law enforcement agencies of Argentina
Argentina
Argentina
1999 establishments in Argentina